This is a list of county courthouses in Arizona.  Each county in Arizona has a city that is the county seat where the county government resides, including a county courthouse.

See also
List of United States federal courthouses in Arizona
List of United States federal courthouses (nationwide)
List of county courthouses in the United States (nationwide)

Courthouses in Arizona
Arizona
Courthouses